Barker Creek is a stream in Benton, Henry and
Pettis counties in the U.S. state of Missouri. It is a tributary of Tebo Creek.

The stream headwaters arise in southern Pettis County east of Windsor. The stream flows south-southwest through the northwest corner of Benton County and into Henry County east of Calhoun. It passes west of Roseland and enters Tebo Creek within the waters of Truman Reservoir and the Tebo State Wildlife Area.

Barker Creek has the name of Dick Barker, a pioneer citizen.

See also
List of rivers of Missouri

References

Rivers of Benton County, Missouri
Rivers of Henry County, Missouri
Rivers of Pettis County, Missouri
Rivers of Missouri